Tiaodeng station is an interchange station on Line 5 and Jiangtiao line of Chongqing Rail Transit in Chongqing municipality, China. It is located in Dadukou District and opened in 2021. This station serves as the southern terminus of Line 5 and the northern terminus of Jiangtiao line.

Line 18 will also reach this station when the construction is finished.

Station structure

Line 5 and Jiangtiao line
Line 5 and Jiangtiao line form a cross-platform interchange. The two inner ones are used for Line 5 trains, while the other two outer ones are used for Jiangtiao line trains.

References

Railway stations in Chongqing
Railway stations in China opened in 2021
Chongqing Rail Transit stations